Peak bagging or hill bagging is an activity in which hikers, climbers, and mountaineers attempt to reach a collection of summits, published in the form of a list. This activity has been popularized around the world, with lists such as 100 Peaks of Taiwan, four-thousand footers, 100 Famous Japanese Mountains, the Sacred Mountains of China, the Seven Summits, the Fourteeners of Colorado, and the eight-thousanders becoming the subject of mass public interest.

There are numerous lists that a peakbagger may choose to follow. A list usually contains a set of peaks confined to a geographical area, with the peaks having some sort of subjective popularity or objective significance, such as being among the highest or most prominent of the area. Some maps and lists may be inaccurate, however, which has implications for climbers and peak-baggers who rely on publicly reported data. 

Although peak bagging is a fundamental part of the sport of mountaineering, the term is strongly associated with hiking and other non-technical activities like snowshoeing. A handful of lists, such as the eight-thousanders and the Alpine four-thousanders, have an extremely high reputation among mountaineers, but in general the term "peak bagging" is a pejorative to many climbers.

Peak bagging is distinguished from highpointing, where the goal is to reach the highest point in some geographic area (e.g. county, state, or country), whether or not it is a peak.

History

During the Silver Age of Alpinism in the late 19th century, most of the unclimbed major mountaineering objectives were reached. With the "closing" of the age of discovery of mountain peaks, interest shifted towards finding enjoyable ways to climb already-ascended mountains. In the 1890s, Sir Hugh Munro created Munro list of the highest peaks of Scotland; summiting the peaks on such lists soon became known as peak bagging.  Peak bagging was brought to the United States by Robert and George Marshall in 1918.

Aspects 
A central part of peak bagging is the list, which details all the summits one must obtain to complete or finish the list. In some cases, a climber who finishes a list may receive some form of award, such as an emblem or badge. In the case of the eight-thousanders list, some mountaineers may become famous within the mountaineering community.

Clubs 
Clubs are often formed to gather people who share an interest in bagging peaks on a list. Some clubs are specialized, such as the Sierra Peaks Section or the Adirondack Forty-Sixers. Alpine clubs may include peak bagging as one of the activities in which its members may participate; notable alpine clubs that maintain peak bagging lists include the Scottish Mountaineering Club, the Mazamas of Oregon and the Mountaineers of Washington. Other clubs may promote the climbing of peaks on a peak bagging list they do not maintain, or they may create an authoritative version of a list that is already popular; a reflection of this is the relationship between the 4000m peaks of Alps and the UIAA.

Clubs maintain listings of people who have completed peak bagging lists, and also provide opportunities for social interaction, such as through outings and club events.

Books 
Another source of lists come from mountaineering guidebooks that detail information about how to climb peaks in a certain region. Mountaineers will often try to climb all or some of the peaks described in these books. 100 Famous Japanese Mountains, Fifty Classic Climbs of North America, and the Alpine Club Guides are notable examples of such books.

Reaching a summit 

Generally, the summit block has to be reached and the climber must touch or be within a few horizontal meters of the highest point. However this convention is not universal, due to the varying objectives of individual peak baggers. Many clubs have special rules that attempt to address various considerations.

Some peak baggers increase the challenge of summiting a list of peaks in various ways, such as by requiring a minimum vertical climb per peak, climbing within a time limit, climbing in different seasons (such as winter), or climbing the same peak multiple times by different routes. Traditional mountaineers and climbers may elect to only go up routes with certain climbing grades

Various organizations have adopted rules for what to do when a peak is on private land or otherwise inaccessible, whether off-road vehicles may be used, etc.

Summit logs 

In some parts of the world, a summit register or summit log may be located in a watertight container such as a jar or can, stashed in a protected spot. Peak baggers often will write a note or log entry and leave it in the "summit log" as a record of their accomplishment.  Increasingly, peak baggers are also logging their summits online by signing virtual summit logs. One popular website is peakbagger.com, founded by Greg Slayden, which lists mountains and regional highpoints. It allows peak baggers to record their summits.

Arguments for and against 
The term "peak bagging" can have a negative connotation among traditional mountaineers. Traditional climbers or adventurers may argue that peak bagging devalues the experience of climbing in favour of the achievement of reaching an arbitrary point on a map; that bagging reduces climbing to the status of stamp collecting or train spotting; or that is seen as obsessive and beside the point. For example, in explaining why he chose to remove some minor peaks from his guidebook, climber Steve Roper wrote:

Most of the peaks had as their first ascenders those who in a former day would have been called explorers but now could only be thought of as peakbaggers, interested primarily in trudging endlessly over heaps of stones, building cairns, and inserting their business cards into specifically designed canisters especially carried for this purpose. But perhaps I am being too harsh. They’re having their fun.

Some peak baggers say peak bagging is a motivation to keep reaching new summits. For mountain range peak lists, attaining the goal provides the peak bagger with a deeper appreciation for the topography of the range. For example, each peak is typically enjoyed from multiple aspects as the peak bagger also climbs the major neighboring summits.

There is also concern that encouraging the climbing of certain mountains has caused trail damage from erosion through heavy use and, where mountains have no trails, created trails. Proponents note that many peak baggers become active in maintaining trails and more aware about mitigating damage than casual hikers.

See also 
 Eight-thousanders, summits above 8,000 metres (30,000')
 Seven Summits, the highest mountain on each continent
 Seven Second Summits, the second highest mountain on each continent
 Volcanic Seven Summits, the highest volcanos on each continent
 List of mountain lists, list of all peak bagging classifications
 Munro, first peak bagging list

References

External links 
 Peak finder
 peakbagger.com Information and statistics about the mountain peaks and mountain ranges of the world
 peakbucket.com The activity tracking website for peakbaggers worldwide
 peakery.com Worldwide peakbagging community with over 300,000 peak summit logs and peak lists
 peakbook.org International peakbagging community with worldwide peak lists
peakhunter.com is Digital Global Summit Log. The Peakhunter App only allows to create an entry while physically standing on a peak.
hill-bagging.co.uk Database and logging of British and Irish hills 

 
Outdoor locating games